Stara Sela is a small village in the Tuhinj Valley in the Municipality of Kamnik in the Upper Carniola region of Slovenia.

Name
The name of the settlement was changed from Selo to Stara sela in 1952.

See also
Nova Sela (disambiguation)

References

External links
Stara Sela on Geopedia

Populated places in the Municipality of Kamnik